Jorge Andrés Alvarado (born 22 February 1980) is a Chilean footballer. His last club was Deportes Puerto Montt.

References
 
 

1980 births
Living people
Chilean footballers
Ñublense footballers
Puerto Montt footballers
Curicó Unido footballers
Deportes La Serena footballers
Deportes Concepción (Chile) footballers
Chilean Primera División players
Primera B de Chile players
Association football defenders
People from Puerto Montt